Symphyotrichum phlogifolium (formerly Aster phlogifolius) is a species of flowering plant in the family Asteraceae native to the eastern United States. Its flowers have light to dark reddish-purple ray florets and white disk florets with purple triangular lobes.

Gallery

Citations

References

phlogifolium
Flora of the United States
Plants described in 1803
Taxa named by Gotthilf Heinrich Ernst Muhlenberg